Niva Bupa Health Insurance Company Limited (Niva Bupa) is an Indian health insurance company, founded in 2008. It is headquartered in New Delhi, India. 

Niva Bupa Health Insurance Company Ltd. (formerly known was Max Bupa Health Insurance Company Limited) is a joint venture between Fettle Tone LLP (an affiliate of True North Fund VI LLP), a leading Indian private equity firm, and the UK based healthcare services expert, Bupa Singapore Holdings Pte. Limited.

While Bupa has six decades of experience in the healthcare industry and a 29 million customer-base in over 190 countries; Fettle Tone LLP (an affiliate of True North Fund VI LLP) is a leading Indian private equity firm, with a focus on investing in and transforming mid-sized profitable businesses into world-class industry leaders. In the last 20 years, Fettle Tone has invested in more than 50 Indian business, and has successfully guided these companies in making the transition into well-established and large businesses that are valuable, enduring and socially responsible.

The company is regulated by the Insurance Regulatory and Development Authority of India (IRDAI).

History and overview 
Niva Bupa Health Insurance was founded in 2008 as a joint venture between Max India and Bupa and started operations in 2010.

In Jun 2011, it integrated with Insurance Regulatory and Development Authority's Integrated Grievance Management System in real-time, which made the company the first health insurance company in India to have such a system.

In April 2019, the company launched 'AnyTimeHealth (ATH)' machines that allow customers to buy health insurance cover in a few seconds.

It distributes its policies through its agency force and bancassurance partners HDFC Bank, SIB Bank, Federal Bank, Axis Bank Karur Vysya Bank, Bank of Baroda, Indian Bank and IDBI Bank.

Key people 
In May 2020, Krishnan Ramachandran was appointed as the MD and CEO of the company and C. B. Bhave was appointed as the chairman of the board.

Awards and recognition 
 In April 2019, the company won 'The Economic Times Best Brands 2019' award by The Economic Times and Nielsen.
 In April 2018, Max Bupa's GoActive Health Insurance Plan recognized as Product of the Year by research agency Nielsen.
 Max Bupa awarded the Golden Peacock Award 2015 for its product Heartbeat Health Insurance Plan.
 Max Bupa Health Insurance awarded the 'IT Management Best Practices' at the Celent Model Insurer Asia Awards 2016.
 The company received the Best Product Innovation Award for Heartbeat Family First at Indian Insurance Awards 2011.

See also 

 Insurance in India
 Health Insurance Plans
 Bupa

References

External links 
 

  

Financial services companies established in 2008
Health care companies established in 2008
Multinational joint-venture companies
Health insurance companies of India
Indian companies established in 2008
Companies based in Delhi
2008 establishments in Delhi